Seyf-e Sofla (also Romanized as Seyf-e Soflá; also known as Saif Khār, Saik Khār, Sef-e Pā’īn, Seyf, Seyf-e Pā’īn, Siv, and Zif) is a village in Khav and Mirabad Rural District, Khav and Mirabad District, Marivan County, Kurdistan Province, Iran. At the 2006 census, its population was 547, in 104 families. The village is populated by Kurds.

References 

Towns and villages in Marivan County
Kurdish settlements in Kurdistan Province